WROB-LD, virtual channel 25 (UHF digital channel 26), is a low-powered Buzzr-affiliated television station licensed to Topeka, Kansas, United States. The station is owned by Heartland Broadcasting, LLC. WROB-LD maintains offices located in the Two Pershing Square Center, near Crown Center and Union Station in Kansas City and a location in Topeka.

KCKS-LD simulcasts on WROB-LD and KMJC-LD in Louisburg, Kansas.

History
The station first signed on the air on January 13, 2014, carrying programming from the MiCasa Broadcast Network. Originally branded as "Rob TV", the station maintained affiliations with This TV and the Justice Network.

In April 2015, the station changed its on-air branding to the website domain-style brand "TV25.tv"; on June 1, 2015, This TV programming moved to digital subchannel 25.10, with its former slot on the station's main channel becoming an affiliate of Buzzr. On July 28, WROB-LD substantially expanded the number of network affiliations transmitted over its digital signal (a move made possible due to the station's affiliation with multicast networks that transmitted exclusively in standard definition), adding affiliations with the Justice Network (on 25.2), Q Network (an independently programmed service on 25.3), Heartland (on 25.4), Newsmax TV (on 25.5), WeatherNation TV (on 25.6), Untamed Sports TV (on 25.8) and The Works (on 25.9); at that time, MiCasa was relocated to digital subchannel 25.7.

In August 2015, as part of an affiliation agreement between Luken Communications and Heartland Broadcasting, the station added Rev'n on digital channel 25.7, and the Retro Television Network on channel 25.9.

Digital television

Digital channels
The station's digital signal is multiplexed:

References

External links
 

Television stations in Kansas
Buzzr affiliates
True Crime Network affiliates
WeatherNation TV affiliates
Television channels and stations established in 2014
Retro TV affiliates
Low-power television stations in the United States
2014 establishments in Kansas